Charles Dewey "Lefty" Jamerson (January 26, 1900 – August 4, 1980) was a relief pitcher in Major League Baseball. Listed at 6' 1", 195 lb., he batted and threw left-handed.

A native of Enfield, Illinois, Jamerson was a player whose major league career, statistically speaking, was only slightly different from that of Red Bluhm, Eddie Gaedel, or Moonlight Graham. On August 16, 1924, Jamerson pitched for the Boston Red Sox against the St. Louis Browns at Fenway Park. In one inning of work, he allowed two runs on one hit and three walks for an 18.00 earned run average. He did not have a decision. After that, he never appeared in a major league game again. He then played for the Pittsfield Hillies of the Eastern League from 1925 to 1927 and the Hartford Senators of the Eastern League in 1926. He also played for the Hartford Blues of the National Football League in 1926.

After his playing career ended, he served as the head football coach at the University of Memphis in 1942 and at Davidson College from 1948 to 1949.

Jamerson died in Mocksville, North Carolina, at the age of 80.

Head coaching record

Football

See also
 Cup of coffee

References

External links
 
 
 Retrosheet

1900 births
1980 deaths
American football ends
Arkansas Razorbacks football players
Boston Red Sox players
Detroit Tigers scouts
Memphis Tigers football coaches
Davidson Wildcats football coaches
Davidson Wildcats baseball coaches
Hartford Blues players
Hartford Senators players
Major League Baseball pitchers
Pittsfield Hillies players
People from White County, Illinois
Baseball players from Illinois
Players of American football from Illinois